WCWI (106.1 FM) is a radio station broadcasting a hybrid classic hits/classic country format. Licensed to Adams, Wisconsin, United States, the station was built by original owners Roche-a-Cri Broadcasting. It is currently owned by Marcus Jaeger, through licensee Heart of Wisconsin Media, LLC.

In May 2009, the then-WDKM dropped the "K106" name and tweaked its format from classic hits to adult hits (a hybrid of classic hits and adult contemporary). The station changed its call sign to the current WCWI on January 21, 2014.

On May 17, 2020, WCWI changed their format to a hybrid classic hits/classic country format.

References

External links

CWI
Classic hits radio stations in the United States
Radio stations established in 2009